"Ma Nouvelle-France" (meaning "My New France") is a theme song from the French-Canadian film Battle of the Brave (Nouvelle-France), performed by Celine Dion. The pop ballad was released as a promotional single on 1 November 2004, in Canada. "Ma Nouvelle-France" was written by Dion's longtime collaborator Luc Plamondon and produced by Christopher Neil ("Think Twice," "Where Does My Heart Beat Now"). Patrick Doyle composed the music.

Background and release
The historic drama Nouvelle-France takes place in the middle of the 18th century, as France leaves Canada. The film was directed by Jean Beaudin and features Gérard Depardieu among others.

Contacted five months earlier by the producer Richard Goudreau, Dion's husband and manager René Angélil was impressed by the film. Then he gave his green light so that the singer could perform the song "Ma Nouvelle-France."

Dion recorded this song on 3 October 2004, in Las Vegas. It was featured on the Nouvelle-France soundtrack (19 November 2004) and Céline Dion's later album On ne change pas (3 October 2005).

The music video, directed by Jean Beaudin, features dialogues from the film. It was included as a bonus on the On ne change pas DVD in 2005.

"Ma Nouvelle-France" peaked at number 7 in Quebec.

Charts

References

Compositions by Patrick Doyle
Celine Dion songs
2004 singles
French-language songs
Songs with lyrics by Luc Plamondon
Songs written for films
Pop ballads
2004 songs
Columbia Records singles
Epic Records singles
Song recordings produced by Christopher Neil